This topic lists the Racquetball events for 2017.

World and continental events
 April 8–15: 2017 Pan American Racquetball Championships in  San José
 Men's:  Alejandro Landa defeated  Charlie Pratt, 15–10, 15–11.
 Women's:  Rhonda Rajsich defeated  Paola Longoria, 7–15, 15–13, 11–9.
 Men's Doubles:  Alejandro Landa &  Polo Gutierrez defeated  David Horn &  Jake Bredenbeck, 10–15, 15–8, 11–4.
 Women's Doubles:  Paola Longoria &  Samantha Salas defeated  Veronica Sotomayor &  María Paz Muñoz, 15–12, 15–5.

2016–17 International racquetball tour
 September 8–11: Novasors Ghost of Georgetown Kansas City Open in  Kansas City
 Singles:  Kane Waselenchuk defeated  Rocky Carson, 11–4, 11–2, 11–0.
 October 5–9: US Open Racquetball Championships in  Minneapolis
 Singles:  Kane Waselenchuk defeated  Rocky Carson, 11–2, 11–2, 11–6.
 Doubles:  Jose Rojas &  Marco Rojas defeated  Daniel de la Rosa &  Edson Martinez, 15–10, 15–5.
 November 3–6: Galaxy Custom Printing IRT Pro/Am in  Lilburn
 Singles:  Kane Waselenchuk defeated  Daniel de la Rosa, by injury forfeit.
 Doubles:  Charlie Pratt &  Jansen Allen defeated  Alejandro Landa &  Samuel Murray, 15–13, 9–15, 11–6.
 November 17–20: St. Louis Pro Racquetball Winter Rollout in  St. Louis
 Singles:  Kane Waselenchuk defeated  Rocky Carson, 11–6, 11–4, 11–1.
 December 1–4: Monterey Open in  Monterrey
 Singles:  Álvaro Beltrán defeated  Edson Martinez, 11–7, 7–11, 11–2, 1–11, 11–7.
 January 5–8: Coast to Coast California Open in  Oakridge
 Singles:  Kane Waselenchuk defeated  Rocky Carson, 11–7, 11–3, 11–9.
 January 19–22: Lewis Drug Pro/Am in  Sioux Falls
 Singles:  Daniel de la Rosa defeated  Álvaro Beltrán, 11–9, 11–4, 11–7.
 Doubles:  Álvaro Beltrán &  Daniel de la Rosa defeated  Jose Diaz &  Rocky Carson, 15–12, 15–14.
 March 16–19: Shamrock Shootout IRT ProAm in  Chicago
 Singles:  Kane Waselenchuk defeated  Andree Parrilla, 11–1, 11–4, 12–10. 
 March 23–26: Raising Some Racquet for Kids IRT ProAm in  Dayton
 Singles:  Rocky Carson defeated  Daniel de la Rosa, 12–10, 11–9, 9–11, 11–8.
 April 27–30: Florida IRT Pro/Am in  Sarasota (final)
 Singles:  Kane Waselenchuk defeated  Rocky Carson, 11–8, 11–8, 11–2.

2016–17 Ladies professional racquetball tour
August 12 – June 4: 2016–17 Ladies Professional Racquetball Tour
 August 12–14, 2016: LPRT Atlanta Singles & Doubles Championships in  Atlanta
 Single:  Frédérique Lambert defeated  Alexandra Herrera, 11–6, 11–3, 11–9.
 Doubles:  Jordan Cooperrider /  Alexandra Herrera defeated  Regina Franco /  Maritza Franco, 15–4, 15–9.
 September 2–4: The Paola Longoria Experience in  San Luis Potosí City
 Singles:  Paola Longoria defeated  Frédérique Lambert, 11–3, 11–3, 11–1.
 Doubles:  Samantha Salas &  Paola Longoria defeated  Gabriela Martinez &  Monserrat Mejia, 14–15, 15–4, 11–3.
 September 9–11: Sweet Caroline Open in  Greenville
 Singles:  Paola Longoria defeated  Frédérique Lambert, 12–10, 11–1, 6–11, 11–4.
 Doubles:  Adriana Riveros &  Paola Longoria defeated  Alexandra Herrera &  Frédérique Lambert, 15–14, 15–12.
 September 21–25: WOR – 3 WallBall in  Las Vegas (outdour)
 Singles:  Janel Tisinger defeated  Michelle Key, 15–4, 15–11.
 Doubles:  Aimee Ruiz &  Janel Tisinger defeated  Michelle Key &  Paola Longoria, 15–8, 6–15, 11–10.
 October 5–9: US Open Racquetball Championships in  Minneapolis
 Singles:  Paola Longoria defeated  Samantha Salas, 11–3, 11–7, 11–3.
 Doubles:  Paola Longoria &  Samantha Salas defeated  Frédérique Lambert &  Veronica Sotomayor, 15–10, 15–0.
 October 28–30: Boston Open in  Boston
 Singles:  Paola Longoria defeated  Frédérique Lambert, 11–3, 11–3, 11–4.
 Doubles:  Paola Longoria &  Rhonda Rajsich defeated  Frédérique Lambert &  Jessica Parrilla, 15–2, 15–12.
 November 4–6: The Paola Longoria Invitational in  Monterrey
 Singles:  Paola Longoria defeated  Frédérique Lambert, 13–11, 11–9, 14–12.
 Doubles:  Paola Longoria &  Samantha Salas defeated  Frédérique Lambert &  Jessica Parrilla, 15–4, 12–15, 11–2.
 November 18–20: KipSplat Open in  Bremerton
 Singles:  Paola Longoria defeated  Alexandra Herrera, 11–4, 11–5, 12–10.
 December 9–11: Christmas Classic  Severna Park
 Singles:  Paola Longoria defeated  Frédérique Lambert, 11–2, 11–3, 10–12, 11–1.
 Doubles:  Paola Longoria &  Samantha Salas defeated  Frédérique Lambert &  Jessica Parrilla, 10–15, 15–9, 11–7.
 March 3–5: New Jersey Open in  Warren
 Singles:  Paola Longoria defeated  Cristina Amaya, 11–4, 11–2, 11–4.
 Doubles:  Gabriela Martinez &  Paola Longoria defeated  Rhonda Rajsich &  Sheryl Lotts, 15–11, 15–3.
 March 31 – April 2: WOR – AZ WOR VII in  Glendale
 No women's competition here, satellite competition
 April 21–23: Battle at the Alamo in  San Antonio
 Singles:  Paola Longoria defeated  Samantha Salas, 11–9, 11–7, 7–11, 11–4.
 Doubles:  Paola Longoria &  Samantha Salas defeated  Jessica Parrilla &  Carla Muñoz, 15–5, 15–8.
 May 5–7: Paola Longoria Open in  Guadalajara
 Singles:  Paola Longoria defeated  Samantha Salas, 11–0, 12–10, 11–3.
 Doubles:  Frédérique Lambert &  Jessica Parrilla defeated  Alexandra Herrera &  	Monserrat Mejia, 15–12, 11–15, 11–5.
 June 16–18: Paola Longoria Challenge (final) in  Mérida
 Singles:  Samantha Salas defeated  Rhonda Rajsich, 11–3, 11–6, 11–6.
 Doubles:  Paola Longoria &  Samantha Salas defeated  Alexandra Herrera &  	Monserrat Mejia, 15–1, 15–6.

References

External links
 International Racquetball Federation

 
Racquetball by year
racquetball